Verity is both a given name and a surname.

Verity may also refer to:

A synonym of "truth"
Verity (statue), a statue by Damien Hirst in Ilfracombe, UK
Verity Records, a music label
Verity!, a podcast